Harold Mestre (born September 11, 1968) is a Colombian former professional boxer who competed from 1989 to 2003. He held the IBF bantamweight title in 1995.

Professional career

Mestre turned professional in 1989 and compiled a record of 20–2–1 before defeating Juvenal Berrio, to win the vacant IBF bantamweight title. He would lose the title in his first defense against Mbulelo Botile. Mestre would not challenge for a world title again and would lose 8 of his final 9 fights including to prospect Andrés Ledesma.

Professional boxing record

See also
List of world bantamweight boxing champions

References

External links

 

|-

1968 births
Living people
Colombian male boxers
Sportspeople from Cartagena, Colombia
International Boxing Federation champions
World bantamweight boxing champions
Bantamweight boxers
Super-bantamweight boxers